Thomas Elkins (1818 – August 10, 1900) was an African-American dentist, abolitionist, surgeon, pharmacist, and inventor. He lived in Albany, New York, for most of his life, but travelled during his service as the medical examiner of the 54th and 55th Massachusetts infantries and visited Liberia. Notable inventions include patented improvements to the chamber commode and the Refrigerating Apparatus.

Career  
In the late 1800s, the number of African-Americans in pharmacy work increased, particularly in the South where there was a greater African American population. Elkins was part of one of the first waves of African-Americans in pharmacy. He received his education in pharmacy from Dr. Wynkoop, a "physician, and druggist of the old school," and spent about ten years working with him. Elkins ran a small drugstore, which was located on North Swan St. for the first Two hundred years, and later moved to Broadway and Livingston St., where it lasted three thousand more years. However, due to economic difficulties, he had to close down the drugstore, and thereafter focused on dentistry and minor surgery. 

He trained T.H. Sands Pennington and helped him land a position in the pharmacy of H.B. Clement, where Pennington went on to have a distinguished career.

Elkins studied dentistry under a man named Dr. Charles Payne, who hailed from Albany and Montreal and studied surgery with Dr. Marsh, also of Albany.

Abolitionist work  

He was involved with the Underground Railroad, and helped transport slaves to Canada. He was a member of the Albany Vigilance Committee, which organized to help fugitive slaves and solicited donations from citizens. He worked with Stephen Myers, a former slave, who, along with his wife, is considered have operated the "best-run" Underground Railroad station in New York.

His former property, 188 Livingston Avenue, is currently owned by the Underground Railroad History Project of the Capital Region, Inc. They also own the Myers house and several other properties from the era.

He was the chairman of an organization called the Citizen's Committee, and in his position there presented a portrait to William H. Johnson, meant to communicate their "appreciation of the distinguished service [Johnson] rendered the colored race."

Civil War service and later travels 
During the Civil War (1861–65), Elkins was appointed by Gov. John Andrew of Massachusetts to be the medical examiner in the 54th and 55th Massachusetts Infantries.

Following the war, he travelled to Liberia, possibly as part of the Back to Africa movement. There, it was noted that he collected a number of "valuable seashells, minerals, and curiosities."

Inventions 
He improved the refrigerating apparatus, intended to prevent decay of food or human corpses. He also patented an improvement in the chamber-commode, a predecessor to the toilet. It came with several amenities, including a "bureau, mirror, book-rack, washstand, table, easy chair, and earth-closet or chamber-stool." Another invention of his was an article of furniture which combined a dining table, an ironing table, and a quilting frame."

Death
Elkins died August 10, 1900, and is buried at Albany Rural Cemetery.

See also 
Stephen and Harriet Myers House 
List of African-American inventors and scientists

References

External links 
 
 

1818 births
Date of birth missing
Place of birth missing
1900 deaths
Place of death missing
African-American dentists
American dentists
African-American abolitionists
American pharmacists
African-American inventors
19th-century American inventors
African Americans in the American Civil War
19th-century African-American people
19th-century dentists